Çavlan (Çavlan Köyü) is a village in Şiran district of Gümüşhane province in Turkey. The village has Alevi and Kurdish population. Village's economy is based on animal breeding and barley harvesting.

Çavlan means "waterfall" in Turkish despite there is no waterfall exists in the village, the old name of the village was "Çalan" which means "pits" in Kurdish Kurmanji dialect.

References

Villages in Gümüşhane Province